The 420th Engineer Brigade (Corps) is a combat engineer brigade of the United States Army based in Bryan, Texas. It is a United States Army Reserve formation and is subordinate to III Corps.

Background 
The brigade is a Major Subordinate Command of the 416th Engineer Command in Darien, IL. The Commander, 420th Engineer Brigade commands and controls all Army Reserve engineer units in the states of Texas, Arkansas, Louisiana, Oklahoma, Missouri, Colorado, and New Mexico consisting of approximately 4,500 reserve soldiers. The units of the 420th Engineer Brigade have served in Operation Joint Forge in Bosnia, Operation Joint Endeavor in Kosovo, Operation Desert Storm, Operation Iraqi Freedom, and Operation Inherent Resolve in Iraq, Operation Enduring Freedom and Operation Resolute Support in Afghanistan. They have also participated in Exercises Bright Star in Egypt, Fuerte Caminos in Honduras and Belize, and Nuevas Horizontes in El Salvador, Panama, and Guatemala.

Organization 
The brigade is a subordinate unit of the 416th Theater Engineer Command (Darien, Illinois). The brigade contains four subordinate battalions:

 244th Engineer Battalion, in Denver, Colorado
 489th Engineer Battalion, in Little Rock, Arkansas
 961st Engineer Battalion, in Seagoville, Texas
 980th Engineer Battalion, in Austin, Texas

Lineage
Constituted 13 February 1951 in the Organized Reserve Corps as Headquarters and Headquarters Company, 420th Engineer Aviation Brigade

Activated 15 February 1951 at College Station, Texas

(Organized Reserve Corps redesignated 9 July 1952 as the U.S Army Reserve)

Reorganized and redesignated 30 April 1953 as Headquarters and Headquarters Company, 420th Engineer Brigade

Redesignated 8 November 1955 as Headquarters and Headquarters Company, 420th Engineer Aviation Brigade

Redesignated 15 January 1957 as Headquarters and Headquarters Company, 420th Engineer Brigade

Location changed 3 November 1958 to Bryan, Texas

Ordered into active military service 7 December 2003 at Bryan, Texas; released from active military service 3 June 2005 and reverted to reserve status

Ordered into active military service 15 March 2008 at Bryan, Texas

Campaign participation credit
War on Terrorism

The 980th Engineer Battalion (Combat)(Heavy) spent time in Iraq from 2004 to 2005 (OIF II)

The 489th Engineer Battalion (Combat)(Mechanized) spent time in Iraq from 2003 to 2004 and in Afghanistan from 2013 - 2014. - A Co, B Co, C Co, D Co, HHC, FSC

The 341st Engineer Co. spent time in Iraq from 2008 to 2009.

The 688th Engineer Co. spent time in Iraq from 2008 to 2009.

The 955th Engineer Co. spent time in Iraq from 2008 to 2009 and in Afghanistan 2013–2014.

The 277st Engineer Co. spent time in Iraq from 2009 to 2010.

The 401st Engineer Co. (Multi-Role Bridge) spent time in Iraq from 2009 to 2010. 15 man Forward detachment spent time in Iraq, Syria, and Kuwait 2018–2019 in support of Operation Inherent resolve.

The 806th Engineer Co. spent time in Afghanistan from 2010 to 2011.

The 980th Engineer Battalion (Combat)(Heavy) spent time in Afghanistan from 2011 to 2012.

The 721st Engineer Co. spent time in Afghanistan from 2011- 2012 and in 2018–2019.

The 321st Engineer Co. spent time in Afghanistan from 2012 to 2013.

The 704th Engineer Co. spent time in Afghanistan from 2012 to 2013.

A detachment of the 808th Engineer Co. spent time in Afghanistan from 2013 to 2014.

The 606 Engineering Facilities Detachment spent time in Afghanistan from 2014 to 2015.

The 420th Engineer Brigade Headquarters and Headquarters Company deployed to Kuwait as the Theater Engineer Brigade in support of Operation Spartan Shield in March 2017.

The 961st Engineer BN spent time in Kuwait, Iraq & Syria from 2018 to 2019 in support of Operation Inherent Resolve.

D Co, 299th Engineer Battalion (Corps)(Combat) deployed for Operations Desert Shield, Desert Storm and Provide Comfort.

Awarded Multiple Purple Hearts, CAB's, Bronze Stars, NAM's, and many other awards

References

External links
420th Engineer Brigade Homepage
Lineage and Honors Information: 420th Engineer Brigade
The Institute of Heraldry: 420th Engineer Brigade

Engineer 420
Bryan, Texas
Military units and formations of the United States Army Reserve
Military units and formations established in 1951
1951 establishments in the United States